Delta Queens is a women's football club in Delta State, Nigeria. It is one of the most successful Nigerian club sides. They compete in the Nigeria Women Premier League, the highest division of female football in the country.

History 
Delta Queens was formed by the government of Governor James Ibori in January 2000. The administration of the club was headed by Commissioner for Sports, Solomon Ogba.

Current squad 
Squad list for 2019 season.

Notable former players
This list of notable former players consists of players who have represented their country at the international level.
Halimatu Ayinde
Okobi Ngozi
Vera Okolo

Honours 
 Nigerian Women's Cup – 2004, 2006, 2007+2008, 2009
 Nigeria Women Premier League – 2003, 2008, 2009, 2011

References

Women's football clubs in Nigeria
Nigeria Women Premier League clubs
Association football clubs established in 2000
2000 establishments in Nigeria
Sport in Delta State
NWFL Premiership clubs